The Scolecomorphidae (from  , 'wormlike' and  , 'form') are a family of caecilians also known as tropical caecilians, buried-eyed caecilians, or African caecilians. They are found in Cameroon in West Africa, and Malawi and Tanzania in East Africa. Caecilians are legless amphibians which superficially resemble worms or snakes.

Scolecomorphids have only vestigial eyes, which are attached to the base of a pair of tentacles underneath the snout. Unlike other caecilians, they have only primary annuli; these are grooves running incompletely around the body, giving the animal a segmented appearance. All other caecilians have a complex pattern of grooves, with secondary or tertiary annuli present. Also uniquely amongst tetrapods, the scolecomorphids  lack a stapes bone in the middle ear.

At least some species of scolecomorphids give birth to live young, retaining the eggs inside the females' bodies until they hatch into fully formed offspring, without the presence of a free-living larval stage.

Taxonomy 
Just six species of scolecomorphids are known, grouped into two genera, as follows:

Family Scolecomorphidae
 Genus Crotaphatrema Nussbaum, 1985 
 Crotaphatrema bornmuelleri (Werner, 1899), Bornmuller's caecilian, Cameroon  	 	
 Crotaphatrema lamottei (Nussbaum, 1981), Mont Oku caecilian, Cameroon 	 	
 Crotaphatrema tchabalmbaboensis Lawson, 2000, Cameroon 	 	
 Genus Scolecomorphus Boulenger, 1883
 Scolecomorphus kirkii Boulenger, 1883, Kirk's caecilian or Lake Tanganyika caecilian, East Africa 	 	
 Scolecomorphus uluguruensis Barbour and Loveridge, 1928, Uluguru black caecilian or Nyingwa caecilian, Tanzania  	
 Scolecomorphus vittatus (Boulenger, 1895), ribbon  caecilian or banded caecilian, Tanzania

References 

Nussbaum, Ronald A. and Mark Wilkinson (1989). "On the Classification and Phylogeny of Caecilians." Herpetological Monographs, (3), 1-42

 
Amphibian families
Amphibians of Sub-Saharan Africa
Taxa named by Edward Harrison Taylor